Ian Watson (born 5 February 1960) is an English former professional footballer who played as a goalkeeper for Sunderland.

References

1960 births
Living people
Sportspeople from North Shields
Footballers from Tyne and Wear
English footballers
Association football goalkeepers
Sunderland A.F.C. players
Rochdale A.F.C. players
Newport County A.F.C. players
Carlisle United F.C. players
Berwick Rangers F.C. players
English Football League players